The Buddhist monastic school system in Myanmar is an old education system with a very long history, dated back to the 11th century King Anawrahta period. The schools provided important education needs throughout Myanmar's history and they were the only source of education for lives ranging from royal princes to unskilled workers. The Buddhist monastic schools helped to give Myanmar a rate of literacy considerably above those of other East Asian countries in the early 1900s. In 1931, 56% of males over the age of five and 16.5% of females were literate — approximately four times as high as those reported for India at the same time.

Nowadays, the monastic schools assist in providing basic education needs of the country especially for children from needy families and orphans — filling the significant gap in the education system. The primary school children of Myanmar attend the Buddhist monasteries to acquire literacy and numeracy skills as well as knowledge of the Lord Buddha’s teachings. Thus, the schools provide curriculum education and ethics and moral foundation. Their role as principal education providers may have ceased for many years, but their contribution is still significant in 21st century Myanmar. Supplementing the government elementary schools, they provide underprivileged children all the basic education needs exactly as it does in government elementary schools by using the same curriculum. 

Generally, Myanmar monastic schools accept children from needy families who live nearby and are unable to attend government schools. Many of the orphans who attend monastery schools in Yangon and Mandalay are from remote areas and have been sent by senior monks from their villages and small towns. Some operate similarly as boarding schools and some as day schools depending on the situation and support of the public.

The schools are required to cooperate closely with township education authorities to be officially recognized. The operation and finance rely heavily on donations and collaboration from the public. The fees of most of the students at the school were covered by these donations, and some parents were able to make a small contribution. 

In the 2004-2005 academic year, there were nearly 1190 monastic schools, providing primary and secondary education to more than 100,000 Myanmar children.

References

External links
Monasteries aid in teaching the needy, The Myanmar Times, Feb 2005.
Myanmar’s literacy promotion campaigns, The Myanmar Times, Oct 2004.
Japanese NGO aids monastery schools, The Myanmar Times, Oct 2003.

Buddhist schools in Myanmar